The 1980 Air Canada Silver Broom, the men's world curling championship, was held from March 24 to 29 at the Moncton Coliseum in Moncton, New Brunswick, Canada.

Teams

Round-robin standings

Round-robin results

Draw 1

Draw 2

Draw 3

Draw 4

Draw 5

Draw 6

Draw 7

Draw 8

Draw 9

Playoffs

Semifinal

Final

External links

World Men's Curling Championship
1980 in curling
1980 in Canadian curling
Curling competitions in Moncton
March 1980 sports events in Canada
International sports competitions hosted by Canada
1980 in New Brunswick